Maxfeld station is a Nuremberg U-Bahn station, located on the U3.

References

Nuremberg U-Bahn stations
Railway stations in Germany opened in 2008
Buildings and structures completed in 2008